Vladan Milosavljev (born 1 February 1987) is a Serbian footballer who plays as a left winger for Inđija.

Club career
He came to Ostrava in July 2012. He made his debut for FC Baník Ostrava against FK Baumit Jablonec on 28 July 2012.

On 29 December 2017 he joined Trikala.  On 6 January 2018 he made his debut and scored a late winner in an away match against Veria. 

On 30 June 2021, he returned to Inđija.

External links
 Baník Ostrava profile

References

1987 births
Living people
Footballers from Belgrade
Serbian footballers
Association football midfielders
FK Rad players
Red Star Belgrade footballers
FK Vardar players
FK Hajduk Kula players
MFK Karviná players
FK Viktoria Žižkov players
FC Baník Ostrava players
Levadiakos F.C. players
FK Borac Banja Luka players
OFI Crete F.C. players
Apollon Pontou FC players
Trikala F.C. players
Luftëtari Gjirokastër players
FC Tyumen players
FK Inđija players
FK Kolubara players
Serbian SuperLiga players
Serbian First League players
Macedonian First Football League players
Czech National Football League players
Czech First League players
Super League Greece players
Premier League of Bosnia and Herzegovina players
Football League (Greece) players
Kategoria Superiore players
Russian First League players
Serbian expatriate footballers
Expatriate footballers in North Macedonia
Expatriate footballers in the Czech Republic
Expatriate footballers in Greece
Expatriate footballers in Bosnia and Herzegovina
Expatriate footballers in Albania
Expatriate footballers in Russia
Serbian expatriate sportspeople in North Macedonia
Serbian expatriate sportspeople in the Czech Republic
Serbian expatriate sportspeople in Greece
Serbian expatriate sportspeople in Bosnia and Herzegovina
Serbian expatriate sportspeople in Albania
Serbian expatriate sportspeople in Russia